Ak-Döbö (before 2001: Орловка Orlovka) is a village in the Talas Region of Kyrgyzstan. It is part of the Bakay-Ata District. Its population was 4,912 in 2021.

References

Populated places in Talas Region